Orchard Point is a shopping centre in Singapore.

History
Orchard Point was built in 1982, replacing the Orchard Road Market. In July 1989, Pidemco Holdings announced plans to turn Orchard Point into a centre for arts and crafts. The shopping centre received a $29 million face-lift in 1991. The facelift also included the introduction of two curved escalators, making Orchard Point the first shopping centre in Singapore to have curved escalators. Following the facelift, fashion boutiques Episode, Jessica and Excursion became the mall's anchor tenants. The shopping centre officially reopened on 22 March 1993.

Australian fabric, crafts and home furnishings retailer Spotlight opened its first overseas outlet in Orchard Point at the end of August 1995. The store took up the entire third floor of the mall.

In 2001, the mall was sold to department store group OG. Many of the centre's art centres and galleries began moving out of the centre in 2002 due to the rising cost of rent.

References

Shopping malls in Singapore